Hans Leu the Younger (ca. 1490 – 24 October 1531) was a Swiss painter, native to Zürich.

He was the son of the painter Hans Leu the Elder, with whom he probably had his first training as an artist. He traveled in Nuremberg ca. 1510 where he worked in the studio of Albrecht Dürer, and he later may have worked with Hans Baldung in Freiburg-im-Breisgau. By 1514 he had returned to Zürich, where he became the city's foremost painter.

As Zürich came under the influence of the iconoclastic church reformer Huldrych Zwingli, commissions for church decorations became scarce. Much of Leu's work was destroyed by followers of Zwingli in 1523. Leu became a mercenary to support himself, and was killed on 24 October 1531 in the battle of Gubel.

Leu's surviving works include a small number of paintings and woodcuts, drawings of religious subjects, and landscape studies. Museums holding works by Leu include the Städel in Frankfurt and the Fogg Art Museum in Cambridge, Massachusetts, United States.

References

1490s births
1531 deaths
16th-century Swiss painters
Swiss male painters
Swiss military personnel killed in action
Year of birth uncertain